Saint-Erblon is a commune in the Mayenne department in north-western France.

Geography
The Semnon forms all of the commune's northern border.

See also
Communes of the Mayenne department

References

Sainterblon